The Mid-Ohio Christian Athletic League (MOCAL) is a middle and high school athletic league consisting of schools and teams in the Columbus, Ohio metro area.  All six current league members are also members of the Ohio High School Athletic Association (OHSAA).

Members

References

Ohio high school sports conferences
Christian sports organizations